Government Degree College, Akbarpur  is a degree college in Akbarpur, in Kanpur Dehat district, Uttar Pradesh state, India. The college is affiliated with Chhatrapati Shahu Ji Maharaj University in Kanpur.

Location
The college is located on National Highway-2 (Kanpur-Agra high way).

Facilities
Library (with 10,000 books)
Guest house
Gymnasium
Sports facilities

Faculties
Arts (Hindi, English, political science, economics, history)
Physical Education

List of Principals
D.C.Rajwar (Off.)
Y.P.Singh (Off.)
Raghvendra Mall
B.N.Mishra (Off.)
M.P.Gupta
B.N.Mishra (Off.)
Geeta Gupta (Off.)
Sapna Pandey (Off.)
Shashi Bala Tiwari (Off.)
Swapna Chattopadhyay (27 Feb 2009---3 August 2013)
Suneel Kumar Saxena (4 August 2013---present)

References

Universities and colleges in Uttar Pradesh
Colleges affiliated to Chhatrapati Shahu Ji Maharaj University
Education in Kanpur Dehat district
Educational institutions established in 1996
1996 establishments in Uttar Pradesh